Twelve ships of the French Navy have borne the name Hermione, in honour of Hermione, daughter of King Menelaus of Sparta and his wife, Helen of Troy.

Ships 
 , a 30-gun frigate, lead ship of her class
 , a 34-gun frigate
 , a 24-gun frigate
 , a 22-gun frigate
 , a 32-gun 
 , a frigate that bore the name Hermione during her career
 , a 40-gun 
 , a 46-gun frigate
  (1860), a 28-gun frigate converted to steam on keel
 , a 
  an  broken up incomplete on slip in 1940

See also 
 , a replica of the Hermione of 1779, currently in service.

Notes and references

Notes

References

Bibliography 
 
 

French Navy ship names